This is a list of public art in the Staffordshire county of England. This list applies only to works of public art on permanent display in an outdoor public space. For example, this does not include artworks in museums.

Burton upon Trent

Shobnall

Burton Town Centre

The Washlands

Anglesey

Cannock

Hednesford

Lichfield

Market Square

Lichfield Cathedral

Beacon Park

Garden of Remembrance

Newcastle-under-Lyme

Rocester

Rugeley

Stafford

Victoria Park

Stafford Town Centre

Stoke-on-Trent

Central Stoke

Etruria

Hanley

Tamworth

References 

sta
Culture in Staffordshire
Public art